Peninsulas of Japan include:

Hokkaido 
Nemuro Peninsula
Notsuke Peninsula (a sand spit)
 Oshima Peninsula to the south
Kameda Peninsula southeast fork of Oshima Peninsula
Matumae Peninsula southwest fork of Oshima Peninsula
Shakotan Peninsula on the most eastern coast
Shiretoko Peninsula on the east coast

Honshu 
 Atsumi Peninsula
 Bōsō Peninsula
 Chita Peninsula
 Ise-Shima
 Izu Peninsula
 Kii Peninsula
 Miura Peninsula
 Natsudomari Peninsula
 Noto Peninsula
 Oga Peninsula
 Oshika (Ojika) Peninsula
 Shimokita Peninsula
 Tsugaru Peninsula

Shikoku
 Sadamisaki Peninsula
 Takanawa Peninsula

Kyushu 
 Kitamatsuura Peninsula
 Kunisaki Peninsula
 Nagasaki Peninsula
 Nishisonogi Peninsula
 Ōsumi Peninsula
 Satsuma Peninsula
 Shimabara Peninsula
 Uto Peninsula

Okinawa 
 Chinen Peninsula
 Henoko Peninsula
 Katsuren Peninsula
 Motobu Peninsula
 Yomitan peninsula

Japan
Peninsulas